Min Byeong-sun (born 21 December 1974) is a South Korean rower. She competed in the women's double sculls event at the 1996 Summer Olympics.

References

1974 births
Living people
South Korean female rowers
Olympic rowers of South Korea
Rowers at the 1996 Summer Olympics
Place of birth missing (living people)